Biscuit Tortoni is an ice cream made with eggs and heavy cream, often containing chopped cherries or topped with minced almonds or crumbled macaroons. It is believed to be named after an Italian café owner in Paris in the 18th century.

The dish has appeared on restaurant menus in the United States since 1899, if not earlier.

References

Flavors of ice cream
Italian desserts
Almond desserts